Collective Soul (sometimes referred to as the Blue Album to differentiate from the second self-titled album) is the second studio album by Collective Soul. It became the band's highest selling album to date, going Triple-Platinum, and spent 76 weeks on the Billboard 200 charts. The singles "December," "The World I Know" and "Where the River Flows" all reached No. 1 on the Mainstream Rock Tracks chart, while the first two singles also became major pop hits.

Frontman Ed Roland has considered Collective Soul the band's true debut album; Hints Allegations and Things Left Unsaid was intended more as a promotional demo and a means of acquiring a publishing contract for Roland who in 1995 noted,  "It's so funny for people to compare the two. It's like comparing one band to another band. This record is our first record, flat out."

Production
Amidst the surprise success of "Shine," taken from the Hints, Allegations, and Things Left Unsaid demo recordings, Collective Soul insisted on remixing the songs for a higher quality re-release. However, they were told the time required for this would drain their momentum. The band were instead convinced they could begin recording a new, sophomore effort immediately after finishing their tour schedule.

The recording and mixing of Collective Soul took five weeks, a strained scheduled due to added concerts in late December 1994 which finished on New Year's Eve. Ed Roland wrote thirty-five songs in 1994 and recorded fifteen of them in the studio. Four more were written in the studio which allowed the band to disregard eight of the previous tracks. Lead guitarist Ross Childress helped write "Simple" and "The World I Know" which was greatly encouraged by Roland who wanted a band effort in the studio.

By the time "Smashing Young Man" was being recorded, drummer Shane Evans was on vacation and unreachable. This forced the band to loop a drum sample of his from a DAT before hiring a second drummer to improve it. After many takes, Roland was also disappointed with the final version of "Bleed" but liked the song too much to remove it from the record.

Mixing was completed in the first week of February 1995; mastering was finished on a Friday with the plants opened and the album delivered the next day. The band then went to New York City for a week of publicity and photo sessions.

Promotion and touring
Collective Soul opened for Van Halen during their Balance Tour which began on March 11, 1995 in Pensacola, Florida and ended in May 1995. The band then performed at festivals in the United States before taking a break and then continuing with their own solo tour including club shows. Seven songs from the new album were performed on tour with "Shine" being the only played track from their previous release. A new unnamed song was also performed in concert.

The band's self-titled release included five singles: "December," "The World I Know," "Where the River Flows," "Gel" and "Smashing Young Man." The three former tracks reached No. 1 on the Mainstream Rock Tracks charts and the first two became major pop hits. Music videos were also filmed for some singles and aired significantly on MTV.

Critical reception

In a feat similar to its predecessor, Collective Soul received positive reviews with praise handed to its strong melodies but also indifference for an alleged lack of musical innovation. Paul Evans of Rolling Stone gave the album 3 out of 5 stars. He noted "Roland's flair for McCartneyesque melodic detail" and summed up with "the band proves it has the goods to continue to shine on brightly."

Allmusic's Tom Demalon chose "The World I Know" and "Gel" as AMG Track Picks. He, too, commended the strong melodies and stated "While not exactly ground-breaking, Collective Soul delivers the goods with a dozen, hook-laden songs for which they were awarded another multi-platinum outing."

Track listing
All songs written by Ed Roland, except where noted.

Personnel
Collective Soul:
 Ed Roland – lead vocals, guitars, producer
 Ross Childress – lead guitar, background vocals
 Dean Roland – rhythm guitar
 Will Turpin – bass, background vocals
 Shane Evans – drums

Additional musicians:
 Jackie Johnson – background vocals 
 Bertram Brown – background vocals 
 Becky Russell – background vocals 
 Steven Sigurdson – cello
 David Chappell – viola
 Geremy Miller – violin
 John DiPuccio – violin
 Janet Clippard – contrabass
 Luis Enrique – percussion

Production:
 Matt Serletic – producer
 Greg Archilla – engineer
 Malcolm Springer – second engineer
 Bjorn Thorsrud – second engineer
 Tom Gordon – assistant engineer
 Bob Clearmountain – mixing

Charts

Weekly charts

Year-end charts

Certifications

References

1995 albums
Albums produced by Ed Roland
Albums produced by Matt Serletic
Atlantic Records albums
Collective Soul albums